Menlough is a village in northeast County Galway in Ireland. Located 35 km from Galway, 27 km from Tuam, 30 km from Ballinasloe, and 20 km from Athenry, it forms part of the civil parish of Killascobe.

History
Historically, Menlough was in the Barony of Hymany which was a stronghold of the O'Mannion clan. The ruins of an O'Mannion castle are located in the fields behind the grotto in the centre of the village. Another O'Mannion castle in the parish is better known as there are more extensive ruins. This second ruin is known as Garbally Castle. It is visible to travellers from Galway to Menlough as they pass through Skehana (half parish of Menlough). Other historical monuments include the Catholic parish church of St Marys constructed in 1847, on land granted by the Ffrench family local landlords based in Monivea. Tradition has it that the roof, while under construction, was blown off during the night of the big wind in 1847. Beside the church is a building that was once an RIC barracks. It was burnt down in 1922 during the War of Independence, but later became a Garda Station. It is now a private house. An old IRA monument, erected in the 1990s stands in the centre of the village.

Amenities
There are three pubs in the parish; one is located in Menlough village, one in the townland of Guilka and one in Skehana. There is also one shop.

The parish has two national schools. These are at Garbally (next to the castle) and in Menlough village. The latter school, Menlough National School (also known as Scoil Mhuire Naofa) is a co-educational (mixed) primary school, which had 77 pupils as of November 2009.

Sport
Menlough GAC is the local GAA club and participates in the Galway Football Championship. The club has a number of County Championships to its name at various grades. The club's pitch is located outside the village on the approaches from Galway City. The facility has a clubhouse, dressing rooms and stand, and was developed in the early 1990s.

Hurling is popular in the half parish of Skehana.

Notable people
Padraig Gearr Ó Mannin, member of the United Irishmen, born Menlough

See also
 List of towns and villages in Ireland

References

Towns and villages in County Galway